The 2003–04 season was the 95th season in the history of Real Sociedad and the club's 38th consecutive season in the top flight of Spanish football. In addition to the domestic league, Real Sociedad participated in this season's editions of the Copa del Rey and the UEFA Champions League.

Competitions

Overall record

La Liga

League table

Results summary

Results by round

Matches

Copa del Rey

UEFA Champions League

Group stage

Knockout phase

Round of 16

References

Real Sociedad seasons
Real Sociedad